To Have & to Hold is a Philippine television drama series broadcast by GMA Network. It aired on the network's Telebabad line up and worldwide via GMA Pinoy TV from September 27, 2021, to December 17, 2021.

Series overview

Episodes

References

Lists of Philippine drama television series episodes